The Victims of Immigration Crime Engagement (VOICE) Office was a U.S. government agency established within the Department of Homeland Security under the Trump administration in February 2017. President Donald Trump directed it be established by Executive Order 13768. The office was dissolved by the Biden administration on June 11, 2021, replaced by the Victims Engagement and Services Line (VESL).

The office's mission was to "provide proactive, timely, adequate, and professional services to victims of crimes committed by removable aliens". The office's purpose was to act as a liaison between U.S. Immigration and Customs Enforcement and the victims and their families to ensure they would be provided information about the offender, including the offender's immigration and custody status so that their questions and concerns regarding immigration enforcement efforts would be addressed.

The VOICE office was to issue quarterly reports studying the effects of the victimization by criminal aliens present in the United States. Only one report, in June 2018, was issued through the agency's existence.

Establishment
The office was established pursuant to section 13 of the January 25, 2017, Executive Order 13768 – Enhancing Public Safety in the Interior of the United States, which states:

Sec. 13.  Office for Victims of Crimes Committed by Removable Aliens.  The Secretary shall direct the Director of U.S. Immigration and Customs Enforcement to take all appropriate and lawful action to establish within U.S. Immigration and Customs Enforcement an office to provide proactive, timely, adequate, and professional services to victims of crimes committed by removable aliens and the family members of such victims.  This office shall provide quarterly reports studying the effects of the victimization by criminal aliens present in the United States.

Purpose and background

The stated purpose of the office is to provide information about offenders to victims, and address questions and concerns of victims regarding immigration enforcement efforts. In a speech on February 28, 2017, President Trump discussed the new office and referred to the murders of Jamiel Shaw, Deputy Sheriff Danny Oliver and Detective Michael Davis as victims of immigrant crime. He asserted that victims of immigrant crime have been "ignored by our media, and silenced by special interests".

Reactions

Support
Maria Espinoza, director of the Remembrance Project, an anti-illegal immigration organization, said that such an office was needed "because the perpetrators are illegally in the U.S. If they are here illegally they should be removed from the country". Mark Krikorian, director of the Center for Immigration Studies said "highlighting some victims of criminal aliens doesn't suggest that all immigrants are criminals. Shame on those advocacy groups that are trying to minimize the experience of these families." Hans von Spakovsky of the Heritage Foundation said "that every crime that is committed by someone who is here illegally is a crime that would not occur if they weren't in the country." John Fonte, a senior fellow at the Hudson Institute, said that "the office would serve several good purposes that are directly related to immigration policy, politics, and civic morality."

Criticism
Critics said that the office overlapped and duplicated the mission of the existing Office for Victims of Crime (OVC) within the Department of Justice (DOJ), which was established in the 1980s and serves the victims of all types of crime. The executive director of the National Center for Victims of Crime said of the plan: "It's complete and utter duplication and there's no need. I'm not sure what this office would do or what services it would offer different than what is available at DOJ." Criminologist James Alan Fox, the Lipman Professor of Criminology, Law and Public Policy at Northeastern University, criticized the creation of VOICE, saying that it duplicated the mission of OVC.

An editorial in the Baltimore Sun said that Trump's claim of victims being ignored and silenced was false, noting that crimes by immigrants generally received disproportionate attention in the media. It referred to Trump's statement as "race-baiting".

Tessa Stuart of Rolling Stone said, "The memo doesn't mention it, but presumably the [VOICE] office would distribute the weekly list of criminal actions committed by undocumented immigrants that Trump promised in a recent executive order."

New York City mayor Bill de Blasio and writer Peter Beinart have said that Trump's establishment of the office is a form of scapegoating. Daniel Benjamin, a former U.S. State Department counter-terrorism official now at Dartmouth College, wrote that the office was not intended to meet a real need, but rather was aimed at promoting the view that immigrants are dangerous.

The Washington Post fact-checked Trump's claims regarding immigration and crime and found that "the vast majority of illegal immigrants do not fit Trump's description of aggravated felons", citing studies by the Congressional Research Service. Kevin Drum noted that even the anti-illegal immigration Center for Immigration Studies said that there was "no clear evidence that immigrants commit crimes at higher or lower rates than others." Anti-immigration organizations dispute the relevance of this, as they consider immigrant crime per se a sign of ineffective vetting and enforcement policies.

Amanda Erickson wrote in The Washington Post that publishing regular reports on the illicit behavior of undocumented immigrants – as well as singling out a particular group – "was employed to great effect by Adolf Hitler and his allies. In the 1930s, the Nazis used a similar tactic to stir up anger and hatred toward Jews". Historian Richard Weikart, who has written about the Third Reich said that drawing a direct parallel between Trump and Hitler was "misguided", adding that "this issue doesn't really rise to that level". Erickson said that "a regular government report is a far cry from the Nazis' aggressive, constant drumbeat against the Jews", but added that "The point is not that VOICE equals the Reich Ministry of Public Enlightenment and Propaganda. But when leaders use the levers of government to drum up fear of one group of people, we should all be worried."

See also

 Angel Families
 Immigration and Nationality Act Section 287(g)
 Illegal immigration to the United States
 Illegal immigration to the United States and crime
 Immigration and crime
 Immigration policy of Donald Trump
 Immigration reduction in the United States
 List of executive actions by Donald Trump
 Opposition to immigration

Notes

References

2017 establishments in Washington, D.C.
2021 disestablishments in Washington, D.C.
Illegal immigration to the United States
Internal affairs ministries
Ministries established in 2017
Ministries disestablished in 2021
Organizations based in Washington, D.C.
Organizations established in 2017
Organizations disestablished in 2021
Public safety ministries
U.S. Immigration and Customs Enforcement
Victims' rights
Immigration policy of Donald Trump